Giulio Tononi is a neuroscientist and psychiatrist who holds the David P. White Chair in Sleep Medicine, as well as a Distinguished Chair in Consciousness Science,  at the University of Wisconsin. He is best known for his Integrated Information Theory (IIT), a mathematical theory of consciousness, which he has proposed since 2004.

Biography
Tononi was born in Trento, Italy, and obtained an M.D. in psychiatry and a Ph.D. in neurobiology at the Sant'Anna School of Advanced Studies in Pisa, Italy.

He is an authority on sleep, and in particular the genetics and etiology of sleep. Tononi and collaborators have pioneered several complementary approaches to study sleep:
 genomics
 proteomics
 fruit fly models
 rodent models employing multiunit / local field potential recordings in behaving animals
 in vivo voltammetry and microscopy
 high-density EEG recordings and transcranial magnetic stimulation (TMS) in humans
 large-scale computer models of sleep and wakefulness
This research has led to a comprehensive hypothesis on the function of sleep (proposed with sleep researcher Chiara Cirelli), the synaptic homeostasis hypothesis. According to the hypothesis, wakefulness leads to a net increase in synaptic strength, and sleep is necessary to reestablish synaptic homeostasis. The hypothesis has implications for understanding the effects of sleep deprivation and for developing novel diagnostic and therapeutic approaches to sleep disorders and neuropsychiatric disorders.

Tononi is a leader in the field of consciousness studies,
and has co-authored a book on the subject with Nobel prize winner Gerald Edelman.

Tononi also developed the integrated information theory (IIT): a theory of what consciousness is, how it can be measured, how it is correlated with brain states, and why it fades when we fall into dreamless sleep and returns when we dream. The theory is being tested with neuroimaging, Transcranial magnetic stimulation (TMS), and computer models. His work has been described as "the only really promising fundamental theory of consciousness" by collaborator Christof Koch.

Works

References

External links

Sleep researchers
American psychiatrists
American consciousness researchers and theorists
Living people
Sant'Anna School of Advanced Studies alumni
1960 births
University of Wisconsin–Madison faculty